Maddin Creek is a stream in Washington County in the U.S. state of Missouri. Clancy Branch is one of its tributaries, and it is itself a tributary of the Big River.

Maddin Creek, historically spelled "Madden Branch", has the name of the local Madden family.

See also
List of rivers of Missouri

References

Rivers of Washington County, Missouri
Rivers of Missouri